Al-Malihah (also spelled al-Mleha or Al Mulayhah) is a town in southern Syria, administratively part of the Rif Dimashq Governorate, located on the eastern outskirts of Damascus to the west of Jaramana, in the Ghouta area. Nearby localities include 'Aqraba, Deir al-Asafir, Zabdin, Kafr Batna and Babbila. According to the Syrian Central Bureau of Statistics, al-Malihah had a population of 23,034 as of the 2004 census. The town is also the administrative centre of the al-Malihah nahiyah, which is composed of eight towns and villages having a combined population of 56,652.

References

Populated places in Markaz Rif Dimashq District
Towns in Syria